Euconosia is a genus of moths in the subfamily Arctiinae.

Species
Euconosia aspersa (Walker, 1862)
Euconosia obscuriventris Holloway, 2001
Euconosia xylinoides (Walker, 1862)

References

Natural History Museum Lepidoptera generic names catalog

Lithosiini